The 2012–13 Irani Cup, also called 2012–13 Irani Trophy, was the 51st season of the Irani Cup, a first-class cricket competition in India. It was a one-off match which was played from 21 September 2012 to 24 September 2013 between the 2011–12 Ranji champions Rajasthan and the Rest of India team. M Chinnaswamy Stadium, Bengaluru hosted the match. Rest of India retained the Irani Cup by defeating Rajasthan by an innings and 79 runs.

References

External links
Irani Cup

Irani Cup
Irani Cup